Rose Romano is an Italian-American poet, novelist, essayist, and editor. She founded and edited the journal la bella figura, which promoted the work of Italian-Americans. After a brief but successful run, she folded the journal when she decided to live in Italy. Before leaving the United States, she edited an anthology of poems that had appeared in the journal. She is the author of several novels and volumes of poetry, and her poems have appeared in numerous journals and anthologies.

Life 
Romano was born in Brooklyn in 1951. She began writing novels at the age of eight and poetry at the age of 14. As the grandchild of immigrants from Naples and  Sicily, she often writes on Italian-American themes, and on the intersection of Italian-American and sexual identities. She has been living in Italy since 2003.

Her first two books, Vendetta (1992) and The Wop Factor (1994), have been widely used in women's literature and multicultural studies courses. As the editor of malafemmina press, she has published chapbooks by a number of Italian-American women poets. In 1988, as Italian-American literature experienced something of a "renaissance," Romano reasoned that perhaps Italian Americans had finally become "American enough that we can afford to be Italian." Through her poetry and editing, Romano became a key figure in the newly developing field of Italian-American lesbian and feminist writing. She was the first Italian-American lesbian to present papers to the American Italian Historical Association that spoke of her experiences as an Italian-American lesbian.
She has published three novels, You'll never have me like you want me (2016), Beyond the Leash (2017), and In braccio alla mamma (2019), several books of poetry, including Neither Seen nor Heard (2016).

Works 
 Vendetta malafemmina press, 1992. 
 La Bella Figura 1988-1992: A Choice malafemmina press, 1993. 
 The Wop Factor malafemmina Press, 1994. 
 Neither Seen Nor Heard malafemmina press, 2016. 
 You'll Never Have Me Like You Want Me malafemmina press, 2016. 
 Beyond the Leash malafemmina press, 2017. 
 In braccio alla mamma malafemmina press, 2019.

References

External links 
 Rose Romano at Poets & Writers
 malafemmina press
 

1951 births
20th-century American writers
20th-century American women writers
21st-century American writers
21st-century American women writers
American writers of Italian descent
Living people